José María Pales (born 16 July 1963) is a Spanish table tennis player. He competed in the men's singles event at the 1992 Summer Olympics.

References

1963 births
Living people
Spanish male table tennis players
Olympic table tennis players of Spain
Table tennis players at the 1992 Summer Olympics
Sportspeople from Barcelona